Liberty Meadows is an American comic strip and comic book series created, written and illustrated by Frank Cho. It relates the comedic activities of the staff and denizens of the eponymous animal sanctuary/rehabilitation clinic. The comic strip launched on March 31, 1997, and ran until December 30, 2001.

Publication history
Liberty Meadows is the evolution of University² (University Squared), a strip Cho wrote during his college years for The Diamondback, the student newspaper at the University of Maryland, College Park.

Originally, it was syndicated and appeared in many newspapers, while also being collected in comic books produced by Insight Studios. At the end of 2001, Cho ceased syndication, partly because editors kept censoring it, and announced he would publish it directly in comic book format.

Cho self-published the comic book at first, with Image Comics taking over printing and distribution with issue #27. The comic book went on a hiatus in early 2004, after issue #36. June 2006 saw the publication of issue #37, and Cho commented at the time that he would be "trying to have couple of issues of Liberty Meadows out per year". Issue #37 was the first issue that did not contain material previously published in newspapers, also being the last issue published to date.

From around 2008 until May 2011, the rights to Liberty Meadows were in the hands of Sony Pictures Digital which wanted to develop it as a downloadable series, and then Sony Pictures Television which wanted to develop it as an animated television series. After a change in executives at Sony the projects went inactive, and the rights reverted to Cho, who in May 2011 announced plans to publish issue #38. On February 5, 2012 Frank Cho stated that work on Liberty Meadows had effectively stopped due to other commitments. "I thought I could do Liberty Meadows and my Marvel and outside work but I can't. I have a mortgage and child support that I have to pay each month. As much as I want to do Liberty Meadows (believe me I want to), the other jobs pay better".

Style

Cho freely mixes visual styles in the strip, drawing the majority of the cast like Walt Kelly's anthropomorphic animals, borrowing Dave Stevens's pin-up look for Brandy, and routinely throwing in savage musclemen, apes and dinosaurs in an elaborate homage to multiple illustrators, including Frank Frazetta and Barry Windsor-Smith's work on Conan the Barbarian. He also uses frequent literary and visual references from sources ranging from Michelangelo to the movie Deliverance to commercials for Crest toothpaste.

Cho also makes references to and parodies other comic strips, such as Dilbert, Cathy and Peanuts.

Characters

The humans
 Brandy Carter – A beautiful animal psychiatrist. Her appearance is based on that of actress Lynda Carter, Bettie Page, and women Cho was attracted to in his youth.
 Frank Melisch – A nerdy veterinarian. Frank is in love with Brandy but afraid to tell her.
 Tony – An accident-prone maintenance man.
 Julius – The owner of Liberty Meadows animal sanctuary and an avid fisherman.
 Jen – Brandy's roommate, a sexy rocket scientist who enjoys toying with men.
 Al – Owner of Al's Treetop Tavern, the local bar where many of the other characters hang out. An educated man and believer in various conspiracies.
 Roger – Brandy's ex-fiancé who's trying to win her back.
 Barbara Carter – Brandy's controlling, malevolent mother. She hates Frank, and is constantly scheming to fix Brandy up with Roger.
 John Carter – Brandy's doting father. The complete opposite of Brandy's mother.
 Evil Brandy – Brandy's evil twin from a mirror universe. A megalomaniacal criminal mastermind. In volume 3, she tied up Brandy, duct-taped her mouth shut, and shoved her in a closet in an attempt to impersonate her and kill Frank.
 Alternate Frank / "Ace" – Frank's super-studly twin from a mirror universe. The most feared lawman in the world and Evil Brandy's nemesis.

The animals
 Ralph – A midget circus bear with a perpetual squint and a penchant for inventing dangerous gadgets.
 Dean – A former fraternity house mascot rescued by Brandy, Dean is a lecherous, sexist pig with a drinking problem and an addiction to cigarettes. Dean is at the clinic for detox but keeps breaking the rule forbidding smoking. A recurring segment has him hitting on various women in bars, only to have them beat him for his boorishness.
 Leslie - A dim-witted frog with hypochondria, and Ralph's friend.
 Truman – A cute, naive young duck who always addresses the humans as "sir" and "ma'am."
 Oscar – A mischievous dachshund and Truman's best friend. Oscar is the only animal in the strip who is not anthropomorphized, and does not speak aside from typical canine vocalizations.
 The Cow – A psychotic villain who suffers from mad cow disease.
 Khan – A giant catfish who serves as Julius' constant nemesis. He appears in strips that depict the characters fishing.
 Mike – A raccoon with obsessive–compulsive disorder.

The author
 Frank Cho, aka "Monkey Boy" – Creator of the strip. Appears in the strip as a chimpanzee to break the fourth wall. In the early newspaper strips, Cho often portrayed himself as Frank, a professional, bespectacled member of Liberty Meadows' medical staff, who frequently got into trouble as a result of the various problems of the main characters.

Collected editions
The comics collecting the daily strips have themselves been collected into a series of books:

Awards
Frank Cho has won many awards, including: the prestigious National Cartoonists Society’s Awards for Best Book Illustration (2001) and Best Comic Book (2001), the 2008 Eagle Award, the 1994 Charles M. Schulz Award for Excellence in Cartooning, College Media Association for Cartooning, and Germany’s Max & Moritz Prize for Best International Comic Strip. He was also nominated for the coveted Harvey and Eisner Awards.

References

External links
 
 . Liberty Meadows daily strips and Frank Cho's art blog.

1997 comics debuts
2012 comics endings
American comic strips
Comics about women
Gag-a-day comics
GoComics